The 2017–18 Utah Valley Wolverines men's basketball team represented Utah Valley University in the 2017–18 NCAA Division I men's basketball season. The Wolverines, led by third-year head coach Mark Pope, played their home games at the UCCU Center in Orem, Utah as members of the Western Athletic Conference. They finished the season 23–11, 10–4 in WAC play to finish in second place. They defeated Cal State Bakersfield in the quarterfinals of the WAC tournament before losing in the semifinals to Grand Canyon. They were invited to the College Basketball Invitational where they defeated Eastern Washington in the first round before losing in the quarterfinals to San Francisco.

Previous season
The Wolverines finished the 2016–17 season 17–17, 6–8 in WAC play to finish in fifth place. They defeated Seattle in the quarterfinals of the WAC tournament before losing in the semifinals to Cal State Bakersfield. They received an invitation to the College Basketball Invitational where they defeated Georgia Southern and Rice before losing in the semifinals to Wyoming.

Offseason

Departures

Incoming transfers

Recruiting class of 2017

Roster

Schedule and results 
The Wolverines notably promoted their first two regular-season games as the "Toughest 24 Hours in College Basketball History", complete with a Twitter hashtag of #Toughest24, which involved the Wolverines visiting Pope's alma mater of Kentucky on November 10, followed the next day by a visit to Duke. With Duke ranked No. 1 in the preseason AP Poll and Kentucky ranked No. 5, this marked the first time in the AP Poll era (1948–49 to present) that a team opened its season with road games against two top-5 opponents.

|-
!colspan=12 style=| Exhibition

|-
!colspan=12 style=| Non-conference regular season

|-
!colspan=12 style=| WAC regular season

|-
!colspan=12 style=|WAC tournament

|-
!colspan=12 style=|CBI

References

Utah Valley Wolverines men's basketball seasons
Utah Valley
Utah Valley